Stare Lewkowo  is a village in the administrative district of Gmina Narewka, within Hajnówka County, Podlaskie Voivodeship, in north-eastern Poland, close to the border with Belarus, on the river Narewka.

The village has a population of 450.

References

Stare Lewkowo
Białystok Voivodeship (1919–1939)
Belastok Region